is a Japanese actor, voice actor, narrator and professional mahjong player.

Biography
When Hagiwara was three years old, his parents divorced and he was taken in by his father. However, his father died when he was in the fourth grade, and was then raised by his paternal grandparents in Chigasaki until he was 15 years old. As a result, he spent most of his younger life without his mother.

After graduating from Chigasaki Shiritsu Umeda Junior High School, Hagiwara moved to Tokyo. He enrolled in the part-time program at Tokyo Metropolitan Toyama High School, but dropped out after only one week. Later on, he went to the United States for a short period of time and was impressed by the movie audiences he saw in New York City, which led him to become interested in acting as a career. After returning to Japan, when he was helping out at his mother's bar in Shinjuku, he caught the eye of the casting staff for the TV drama Abunai Deka who had come in as customers, and was recruited. Then, in 1987, he made his debut as a young luggage thief in episode 32 of Abunai Deka. He continued to appear in many films as a minor role, but it was his role as Naojirō Matsuoka in the 1990 TV drama High School Rakugaki 2 that brought him to prominence.

In 1991, he formed the theater group "Early Timelies" with Shōgo Suzuki, Kō Watanabe and Tetsu Sakuma. They performed six shows over a period of seven years. He later established a fanclub in 1993, which disbanded three years later in July 1996.

In 1993, one of the suspects in an assault case at Chūō-Rinkan Station on the Odakyu Line was accused of resembling Hagiwara. Hagiwara claimed to have an alibi, saying that he was meeting someone at the time of the crime, but refused to reveal the name of the person who could prove it, because it would be a nuisance to the person. This case damaged Hagiwara's public and private life, and for a while his appearances in dramas and other events were drastically reduced. Later, however, the case was dismissed on the grounds that the accuser's testimony contained many inconsistencies and it was just an accusation that Hagiwara resembled the killer.

In November 1995, Hagiwara married actress Emi Wakui, with whom he co-starred in the TV drama Natsuko no Sake. They had a son in October 1999 and divorced in July 2003, with Wakui taking custody of the son.

Career
Hagiwara co-starred in Kiyoshi Kurosawa's Cure with Kōji Yakusho and appeared in Hou Hsiao-hsien's Café Lumière. He was supposed to perform in the play "Shinjō Afururu Keihakusa 2001" at Theatre Cocoon in January 2001, but was forced to cancel his performance in December 2000 due to a sensorineural hearing loss that left him temporarily deaf.

He also had a starring role as a vocalist and saxophonist in a jazz band in Junji Sakamoto's Out of This World. After having saxophone lessons with others, he practiced by himself in a karaoke box until his lips were swollen. The second prominent time as a vocalist was in 2007 for the cover of a song by The Blue Hearts, Mirai wa Bokura no Te no Naka, which was used as an opening theme for the anime TV series Kaiji: Ultimate Survivor.

In 2018, he became a Riichi Mahjong professional affiliated with the Japan Professional Mahjong League. In the same year he was drafted by the Team RAIDEN professional Mahjong team for the participation of the team Riichi Mahjong tournament M-League.

Filmography

Film

Television

Animated television series

Animated films

Dubbing
Live-action

Animation

References

External links
 ALPHA AGENCY profile (Japanese)
 NHK Talent Records profile (Japanese)
 
 
 

1971 births
Japanese male actors
Mahjong players
Living people
People from Chigasaki, Kanagawa
Male actors from Kanagawa Prefecture